Kenneth Keniston (January 6, 1930 – February 14, 2020) was an American social psychologist.

Keniston was born in Chicago, and attended secondary school abroad, at the Colegio Nacional de Buenos Aires. He enrolled in Harvard College, and later earned a Rhodes Scholarship to complete his D. Phil in social studies from Balliol College, Oxford. Keniston taught at Harvard University and Yale University before joining the Massachusetts Institute of Technology faculty in 1977, where he served as the Andrew W. Mellon Professor of Human Development. Keniston and his wife Suzanne Berger both received a Guggenheim Fellowship in 1979. Keniston's father Hayward Keniston received a Guggenheim Fellowship in 1953, and his sister Marjorie McIntosh was awarded one in 1995. Keniston died after a long illness on February 14, 2020.

Books
The Uncommitted: Alienated Youth in American Society (1965)

References

1930 births
2020 deaths
American social psychologists
Writers from Chicago
American Rhodes Scholars
Alumni of Balliol College, Oxford
Harvard University alumni
American expatriates in Argentina
20th-century American male writers
21st-century American male writers
20th-century social scientists
21st-century social scientists
Harvard University faculty
Yale University faculty
Massachusetts Institute of Technology faculty